Arthur L. Rusch (born March 16, 1946) is an American politician. He serves as a Republican member of the South Dakota Senate, where he represents District 17 (encompassing parts of Clay County and Turner County).

References

Living people
Republican Party South Dakota state senators
21st-century American politicians
1946 births